William Barker may refer to:

Politicians
William Barker (translator) ( 1570), English translator and MP for Great Yarmouth and Bramber
William Barker (MP for Berkshire) (died 1685), English Member of Parliament for Berkshire
Sir William Barker, 5th Baronet (1685–1731), British Member of Parliament for Ipswich, Thetford and Suffolk
William Barker (Queensland politician) (1819–1886), member of the Queensland Legislative Council
William J. Barker (Denver mayor) (1832–1900), American politician

Judges
William J. Barker (1886–1968), American lawyer and judge
William M. Barker (born 1941), Chief Justice of the Tennessee Supreme Court from 1995 to 2009

Sportspeople
William Barker (Surrey cricketer) (1857–?), English cricketer
William Barker (tennis), British tennis player
Billy Barker (footballer, born 1883) (1883–1937), footballer for Middlesbrough F.C. in the early 20th century; see List of Middlesbrough F.C. players
Bill Barker (footballer) (1924–2002), footballer who played for Stoke City
Will Barker (American football) (born 1987), American football player

Religion
William Barker (priest, died 1776), Irish priest, Dean of Raphoe
William Barker (priest, died 1917) (1838–1917), Dean of Carlisle
William Morris Barker (1854–1901), American bishop of the Episcopal Diocese of Olympia

Others
William Barker (chemist) (1810–1873), Irish professor of chemistry
William Barker (prospector) (1817–1894), English miner and prospector who found gold in Canada
William Burckhardt Barker (1810–1856), English orientalist
William George Barker (1894–1930), Canadian Victoria Cross recipient and World War I flying ace
William Gibbs Barker ( 1811–1897), English clergyman and genealogist
William Higgs Barker (1744–1815), English Hebraist
William Robert Barker, Australian botanist
William S. Barker (born 1934), American church historian, educator, and leader
Will Barker (1867–1951), aka William George Barker, English film producer and director
Bill Barker (born 1957), creator of Schwa, underground conceptual artwork
Bill Barker, police officer who died in the November 2009 Great Britain and Ireland floods, namesake of Barker Crossing
Bill Barker, actor who portrayed Dr. Duckbill Platypus and Elsie Jean Platypus on Mister Rogers' Neighborhood